Henri Chivot (13 November 1830 – 18 September 1897) was a French writer and playwright, mostly known as an operettas librettist.

Biography 
Henri Chivot made his debut in the theatre with a vaudeville in one act for the Théâtre des Folies-Dramatiques, Sous un hangar. With the success he obtained, he continued to write comedies and dramas, mainly in collaboration with his friend Alfred Duru. His plays were presented at the Théâtre des Variétés, the Théâtre du Palais-Royal or at the Folies-Dramatiques.

From 1865, he became a librettist and in collaboration, particularly with Alfred Duru, he wrote many librettos for operettas or opéra comiques for composers famous in the second half of the 19th century.

He had three children including the painter Charles Chivot.

Works 
1866: Zilda ou la Nuit des dupes, written with Vernoy de St-Georges, for Friedrich von Flotow
 In constant collaboration with Alfred Duru for:
 Hervé,
1866: Les Chevaliers de la Table Ronde
 Charles Lecocq
1868:  Fleur de Thé 
1869:  Gandolfo 
1872: Les cent vierges
 Edmond Audran
1879: Les noces d'Olivette 
1880: La Mascotte
1882: Gillette de Narbonne 
1884: Le Grand Mogol
 Jacques Offenbach
1868: L'Ile de Tulipatan 
1873: Les Braconniers 
1878: Madame Favart
1879: La Fille du tambour-major;
 Robert Planquette
1887: Surcouf

External links 
 List of his works
 Henri Chivot on 
List of works by Chivot at the Index to Opera and Ballet Sources Online

French opera librettists
Writers from Paris
1830 births
1897 deaths